Savitri Ganesan (born Nissankara Savitri; 6 December 1935 – 26 December 1981) was an Indian actress, playback singer, dancer, director, and producer known for her works primarily in Tamil and Telugu cinema. She had also worked in Kannada, Hindi and Malayalam films. She starred in more than 250 films over three decades. She was one of the highest-paid and most popular Indian actresses from the 1950s to early 70s, and is known by the epithets Mahanati and Nadigaiyar Thilagam. She is one of the most accomplished, most versatile and she is one of the most respected actresses in South Indian Film Industry. She is known for her liveliness and her captivating performance and is still considered as the benchmark for acting in South Indian movies. 

Savitri's first significant role was in the 1952 Tamil-Telugu bilingual film Pelli Chesi Choodu which simultaneously made in Tamil as Kalyanam Panni Paar . She has starred in successful ventures such as Devadasu (1953) which received special mentions at India International Film Festival, Donga Ramudu (1955), Mayabazar (1957), and Nartanasala (1963), featured at the Afro-Asian film festival in Jakarta. She also starred in works such as Missamma (1955), Ardhangi (1955), Thodi Kodallu (1957), Mangalya Balam (1959), Aradhana (1962), Gundamma Katha (1962), Doctor Chakravarty (1964), Sumangali (1965), and Devata (1965). Savitri was also noted for her kindness, charity, and generosity towards the poor. Savitri received "A Moon Among Stars" honor at the 30th International Film Festival of India, "Woman in Cinema" section in 1999. The 2018 biographical film Mahanati based on the life of Savitri won the "Equality in Cinema Award" at the 2018 Indian Film Festival of Melbourne.

Early life
Nissankara Savitri was born on 6 December 1935 in a Telugu-speaking family in Chirravuru, Guntur district of present-day Andhra Pradesh. Savitri, born to : Nissankara Subhadramma, Guravayya. Her father died when she was six months old, after which her mother took Savitri and an older sibling : Maruti, to live with an aunt and uncle. Her uncle : Kommareddy Venkata Ramayya Chowdary, enrolled her in classes when she began to show a talent for dance.

She was named for the expression of her eyes during dramas. She participated in many dramas, in one where she was rewarded with a garland by the famous actor Prithviraj Kapoor. She, along with her Uncle, went to the Vijaya Vauhini studio in Chennai to enroll Savitri as a character in a movie, though they refused to do so. Not giving up, they tried once again, in another cinema, where she managed to get a role, but could not stand it as she hesitated in reciting dialogues because she was in awe when talking to the hero.

It was then that she met Ramaswamy Ganesan, also known as Gemini Ganesan, who took pictures of Savitri and instructed the duo that they come after two months.
Defeated, Savitri went back to her village and continued playing dramas. On one specific day a man came to their home and asked Savitri to play a role for his cinema. Savitri's career thus began.
Savitri married Tamil actor Gemini Ganesan in 1952, having first met him in 1948. The marriage led to a permanent rift with her uncle because Ganesan was already married, had four daughters, and was involved in an affair with Pushpavalli. Her marriage became public when she signed a photograph as Savitri Ganesh. Ganesan later acknowledged that he had two daughters with Pushpavalli while married to Savitri, with whom he had a daughter and a son.

Career

Savitri acted in dance dramas as a child, including some work with a theatre company run by Jaggayya. She made an unsuccessful speculative trip to find film work in Madras at the age of 14 when she was deemed to be too young to play heroine roles, but in 1950 was cast as the female lead in Samsaram. That role did not become actuality because she became too excited, necessitating numerous retakes and eventually her replacement in the part. She was given a minor speaking role in the film and in the next year had two more minor roles, in Roopavati and Patala Bhairavi, before getting her big break as the second heroine in Pelli Chesi Choodu. She, later on, was propelled to stardom with critically acclaimed roles in blockbusters such as Devadasu and Missamma.

Director PC Reddy who directed Savitri says, “there is none who can equal her beauty and talent. She didn’t heed anyone’s advice and got married very early. I remember she was so addicted to drinking even on the sets; she threw up on my shirt during a shoot. The next day she got a brand new shirt for me. She was a generous woman.” Savitri also worked in Bollywood films, although she did not find much success. Her only Malayalam film was  Chuzhi (1973).

Her performance in the 1957 film Mayabazar skyrocketed her to stardom. She later went on to become the highest-paid and most sought-after South-Indian actress of her generation. Savitri was known for her hospitality, philanthropic gestures, and love of buying property and jewelry, but she kept little control of her spending. Ganesan continued to philander and she was susceptible to favoring hangers-on with her largesse. In 1960, she received the Rashtrapati Award which later became "National Award for the Best Actress" for her performance in the Telugu film Chivaraku Migiledi. In 1968, she produced and directed the Telugu film Chinnari Papalu, for which she received the state Nandi Award for Best Feature Film(Silver). Her career took a downturn in the late 1960s. Her properties were seized by tax officials in the 1970s and she turned to act in any film in her later years, while sycophants encouraged her to direct and produce films that were unsuccessful and financially draining. Among her few supporters during her financial troubles were Dasari Narayana Rao, who cast her in most of his films, such as Gorintaku (1979), and specifically made Devadasu Malli Puttadu (1978) as a movie for her.

Savitri was also one of the top Tamil actresses of her era. She acted with major stalwarts, such as M.G.R, Sivaji Ganesan and her husband, Gemini Ganesan, mostly with the latter. Her notable Tamil works include Kalathur Kannamma (1959), Pasamalar (1961), Pava Mannippu (1961), Paarthal Pasi Theerum (1962), Karpagam (1963), Karnan (1963), Kai Koduttha Dheivam, Navarathri (1964), and Thiruvilaiyadal (1965).

Death
Savitri died on 26 December 1981, at the age of 47, after being in a coma for 19 months. She had developed diabetes and high blood pressure.

Awards
Filmfare Awards South
 Best Actress – Telugu: Devadasu (1953)
Best Actress – Telugu: Mayabazar (1957)
Best Actress – Telugu: Chivaraku Migiledi (1960)
Best Actress – Telugu: Aradhana (1962)
Best Actress – Telugu: Maro Prapancham (1970)
Rashtrapati Award
Chivaraku Migiledi (1960)
Nandi Awards
Best Feature Film: Chinnari Papalu (1968)

Popular culture 
In 2011, The Government of India issued a postage stamp in commemoration of Nissankara Savitri. Nissankara Savitri Ganesan's biopic, titled Mahanati, starring Keerthy Suresh as Nissankara Savitri and Dulquer Salmaan as Gemini Ganesan was released in 2018 to critical acclaim and commercial success.

Notes

References

External links

 

1936 births
1981 deaths
20th-century Indian actresses
People from Guntur district
20th-century Hindus
Indian film actresses
Indian women film producers
Film producers from Andhra Pradesh
Actresses in Tamil cinema
Indian women film directors
Recipients of the Rashtrapati Award
Nandi Award winners
Actresses in Telugu cinema
Actresses in Hindi cinema
Actresses in Malayalam cinema
Actresses in Kannada cinema
Actresses from Andhra Pradesh
20th-century Indian film directors
Film directors from Andhra Pradesh
20th-century Indian businesspeople
Telugu film producers
Alcohol-related deaths in India
Businesswomen from Andhra Pradesh
20th-century Indian businesswomen
Telugu actresses